Wesley Frazan Bernardo (born 5 June 1996), simply known as Frazan, is a Brazilian footballer who plays as a central defender for Ituano.

Career statistics

References

External links

1996 births
Living people
People from Macaé
Brazilian footballers
Association football defenders
Campeonato Brasileiro Série A players
Campeonato Brasileiro Série B players
Fluminense FC players
Clube de Regatas Brasil players
Ituano FC players
Sportspeople from Rio de Janeiro (state)